The JB-3 Tiamat, also designated MX-570, was an early air-to-air missile developed by Hughes Aircraft for the United States Army Air Forces during World War II. Regarded as a purely experimental vehicle, test launches took place for several years before the program was terminated.

Design and development
The Tiamat project began in January 1944, when a contract was awarded to Hughes Aircraft by the U.S. Army Air Forces (USAAF) for development of an experimental subsonic, solid-fueled air-to-air missile. Developed in cooperation with the National Advisory Committee for Aeronautics (NACA), Tiamat was a large missile of vaguely dart-like shape and proportion,  in length and weighing , with three large stabilizing and control fins at the aft end of the missile body. Launched from an A-26 Invader light bomber, Tiamat would use semi-active radar homing to track enemy aircraft, and a proximity fuze was fitted for detonation of the missile's  warhead.

Operational history
The first prototypes of Tiamat were designated MX-570, and were purely instrumented, ground-launched test vehicles launched by NACA at Wallops Island in Virginia to verify the design. MX-570 was slightly smaller than the definitive JB-3, being  in length and weighing  at launch. An additional rocket booster was fitted to provide for zero-length launch. Launches of the MX-570 begin in late 1944, the first missiles to be launched at Wallops Island under the auspices of the Langley Research Center; the first launch of the JB-3 proper took place on 6 August 1945. Testing of both the MX-570 and JB-3 continued through 1947, when the program was terminated, definitive air-to-air missile products being underway.

References

Citations

Bibliography

World War II guided missiles of the United States
Air-to-air missiles of the United States
Hughes Aircraft Company
Langley Research Center